Mrezhichko may refer to the following places:

Bulgaria
 Mrezhichko, Burgas Province
 Mrezhichko, Kardzhali Province

North Macedonia
 Mrezhichko, Macedonia